The persecution of Christians in North Korea is an ongoing and systematic human rights issue in North Korea. According to multiple resolutions which have been passed by the United Nations Commission on Human Rights, the North Korean government considers religious activities political crimes, because they could challenge the personality cult of Kim Il-sung and his family. The Workers' Party of Korea also considers religion a tool of American imperialism and the North Korean state uses this argument to justify its activities.

In 2002, it was estimated that there were 12,000 Protestants, and 800 Catholics in North Korea, but South Korean and international church-related groups gave considerably higher estimates, such as 406,000 Christians.

Treatment of Christians 
According to the Christian organization Open Doors, North Korea persecutes Christians more than any other country in the world.

In a study of 117 North Koreans who had been affected by religious persecution which was conducted by the Korea Future Initiative, it was found that Christians made up about 80% of the people who were surveyed.

Imprisonment 
Christian Solidarity Worldwide says that there are numerous reports of people being sent to prison camps and subjected to torture and inhuman treatment because of their faith. The family members of reported Christians are also said to be targeted, including children. The youngest of these recorded detainees was three years old at the time of their arrest.

Open Doors estimates that 50,000–70,000 Christians are held in North Korean prison camps. According to the Korea Future Initiative, Christians are "disproportionally imprisoned" compared to North Koreans of other faiths.

According to refugee interviews, if North Korean authorities discover that North Korean refugees who were deported from China have converted to Christianity, they are subjected to harsher treatment, torture, and prolonged imprisonment.

Executions 
According to AsiaNews, during Kim Il-sung's administration, all non-foreign Catholic priests were executed, and Protestant leaders who did not renounce their faith were purged as "American spies." The martyrdom of the Benedictine monks of Tokwon Abbey was documented as the process of beatification was initiated for them.

Public executions 
There are reports of public executions of Christians, with a North Korean defector reporting that one Christian was publicly executed in front of a thousand people. For example, Ri Hyon-ok was allegedly publicly executed in Ryongchon on June 16, 2009, for giving out Bibles, while her husband and children were deported to the Hoeryong political prison camp.

Situation of churches 
From 1949 to the mid-1950s, under the rule of Kim Il-sung, all churches were closed. However, since 1988, four church buildings have been erected in Pyongyang with foreign donations: one Catholic, two Protestant and one Russian Orthodox. However, they are only open to foreigners, and North Korean citizens cannot attend the services. The services are used to bring in foreign currency from foreign visitors, including South Koreans. It is therefore clear that the churches are solely there for propaganda purposes. Defectors to South Korea claim that most North Koreans are unaware the churches exist.

Bibles 
The Bible is reported to have been banned in North Korea and several incidents have emerged in which Christians were arrested or executed for possessing and/or selling the book, while other reports state that they have their own translated Bible.

In 2014, an American citizen, Jeffrey Edward Fowle, was detained for several months for proselytism after authorities discovered him leaving a Bible behind in a public restroom during his vacation in the country.

Detention of clergy 

Several pastors, priests, and missionaries who have been campaigning against the persecution have been detained by the North Korean government, for periods ranging from a couple weeks to more than two years, including:

 Hyeon Soo Lim, a Canadian pastor
 Robert Park, an American activist of North Korean Christian descent
 John Short, an Australian missionary
 Kenneth Bae

Reactions 
The persecution has been condemned by a variety of different organizations and movements, including Genocide Watch, the SDLP, and the British Government.

See also 
 Robert Park
 Human rights in North Korea
 Prisons in North Korea
 Religion in North Korea
 Freedom of religion in North Korea

References 

Persecution of Christians
Christianity in North Korea
Human rights abuses in North Korea
Persecution by atheist states
Religious persecution by communists